Wales Island is an Arctic island in the Qikiqtaaluk Region, Nunavut, Canada. It is located within Hudson Strait, an arm of Hudson Bay. It lies just north of the Ungava Peninsula of Quebec.

Islands of Hudson Strait
Uninhabited islands of Qikiqtaaluk Region